The 4 arrondissements of the Nièvre department are:
 Arrondissement of Château-Chinon (Ville), (subprefecture: Château-Chinon (Ville)) with 80 communes.  The population of the arrondissement was 28,291 in 2016.  
 Arrondissement of Clamecy, (subprefecture: Clamecy) with 84 communes.  The population of the arrondissement was 21,364 in 2016.  
 Arrondissement of Cosne-Cours-sur-Loire, (subprefecture: Cosne-Cours-sur-Loire) with 63 communes.  The population of the arrondissement was 43,893 in 2016.
 Arrondissement of Nevers, (prefecture of the Nièvre department: Nevers) with 82 communes.  The population of the arrondissement was 115,613 in 2016.

History

In 1800 the arrondissements of Nevers, Château-Chinon, Clamecy and Cosne were established. The arrondissement of Cosne was disbanded in 1926, and restored in 1943. 

The borders of the arrondissements of Nièvre were modified in January 2017:
 one commune from the arrondissement of Château-Chinon (Ville) to the arrondissement of Clamecy
 one commune from the arrondissement of Château-Chinon (Ville) to the arrondissement of Nevers
 nine communes from the arrondissement of Clamecy to the arrondissement of Château-Chinon (Ville)
 one commune from the arrondissement of Cosne-Cours-sur-Loire to the arrondissement of Clamecy
 one commune from the arrondissement of Nevers to the arrondissement of Château-Chinon (Ville)

References

Nievre